Gopinath is a 1948 Bollywood film, written, produced and directed by Mahesh Kaul. It starred Raj Kapoor, Tripti Mitra, Latika, Mahesh Kaul and Baby Zubeida. The music was composed by Ninu Muzumdar, with lyrics by Surdas, Meerabai and Ram Moorti.

Plot
The story is about Mohan (Raj Kapoor), who wants to write stories for films. His mother (Anwaribai), a heart patient, would like to see him married to Gopi (Tripti Mitra), a friend's daughter staying with them. Gopi has come from the village to Bombay with her brother, who's going to Africa for a job. On Mohan's mother's request and at Gopi's insistence, the brother departs without her. Gopi has been in love with Mohan from their childhood days in the village. Mohan is not interested in her and instead gets involved with Neela Devi (Latika), a famous film star. Gopi's one-sided devotion to Mohan drives her to madness, where she sees him everywhere. Mohan returns disenchanted by Neela.

Cast
 Raj Kapoor as Mohan
 Tripti Mitra as Gopi
 Latika as Neela Devi
 Anwari as Mohan's mother
 Nandkishore
 Randhir
 Ghosh
 Shivaji Rathore
 Mahesh Kaul as Mahesh Kaul 
 Baby Zubeida as Bindu

Soundtrack

References

External links
 

1948 films
1940s Hindi-language films
Indian drama films
1948 drama films
Indian black-and-white films
Hindi-language drama films